Thomas Jerkins House is a historic home located at New Bern, Craven County, North Carolina.  It was built about 1849, and is a two-story, three bay, side-hall plan, Italianate style frame dwelling.  It has a gable roof with overhanging eaves, a full-width porch, and a two-story ell.

It was listed on the National Register of Historic Places in 1972.

References

Houses on the National Register of Historic Places in North Carolina
Italianate architecture in North Carolina
Houses completed in 1849
Houses in New Bern, North Carolina
National Register of Historic Places in Craven County, North Carolina
1849 establishments in North Carolina